Acalitus calycophthirus is an eriophyid mite which causes big bud galls on birch (Betula species) twigs. It is found in Europe and was first described by the Austrian zoologist, Alfred Nalepa in 1891.

Description of the gall
The gall consists of clusters of swollen leaves and, at first in the spring, are silvery-green. They gradually turn brown and become quite woody. The gall shelters a large number of mites which spend most of the year there, passing the winter in a dormant state. In the following spring and early summer they emerge to invade the new buds. Affected trees are silver birch (Betula pendula) and downy birch (Betula pubescens).

Inquiline
A mite, Cecidophyopsis vermiformis is an inquiline of Acalitus calycophthirus, as well as an inquiline of Aceria tenella on hornbeam and Phytoptus avellanae on hazel.

References

Eriophyidae
Animals described in 1891
Arachnids of Europe
Galls
Taxa named by Alfred Nalepa